Lyudmila Muravyova (born 10 November 1940) is a Soviet athlete. She competed in the women's discus throw at the 1968 Summer Olympics and the 1972 Summer Olympics.

References

1940 births
Living people
Athletes (track and field) at the 1968 Summer Olympics
Athletes (track and field) at the 1972 Summer Olympics
Soviet female discus throwers
Olympic athletes of the Soviet Union
Place of birth missing (living people)